Doug Rogers is a former professional American football player who played defensive lineman for five seasons for the Atlanta Falcons, New England Patriots, and San Francisco 49ers. He was drafted in the second round with the 36th overall pick of the 1982 NFL Draft.

References

1960 births
American football defensive linemen
San Francisco 49ers players
New England Patriots players
Atlanta Falcons players
Stanford Cardinal football players
Living people